The Kimber Aegis is a series of M1911 pistols chambered in 9mm Luger as well as .45 ACP and is manufactured by Kimber Manufacturing. It includes the subcompact Ultra Aegis II, the compact Pro Aegis II, and the full-sized Custom Aegis II.

The Aegis has an aluminum frame, a black steel slide with a flat top, fluted rosewood grips or crimson trace laser grips, and tritium night sights.

The Aegis has several features designed to enhance its use for concealed carry.  The aluminum frame reduces the weight of the gun.  The grips are thin, slightly decreasing the width of the pistol, and the butt is rounded.  To minimize snagging, the hammer does not have a spur, and the thumb safety and magazine release have a reduced profile.  Additionally, the edges of the gun are rounded with a "carry melt" treatment.

References

Wilson, Jim. "Why I Like Mini 1911s", Shooting Times
Venola, Richard. "A Widow's Path", Guns & Ammo, November 2007
Decker, Aaron J. "2006 Editor's Roundtable, Day Four", Guns & Ammo
"Kimber Aegis II 9mm", Gun Tests, January 17, 2007
Rodriguez, Greg. "Stylin' with Kimber's Aegis II", Guns & Ammo Annual: The Complete Book of the Model 1911, 2008
Boyd, Bob. Kimber Pro Aegis II review, American Rifleman

External links
Kimber Aegis official website

9mm Parabellum semi-automatic pistols
.45 ACP semi-automatic pistols
1911 platform
Kimber firearms
Semi-automatic pistols of the United States